Deputy Commander of the Indonesian National Armed Forces ( or ) is the second highest position in the Indonesian National Armed Forces. The position is held by the four-star General/Admiral/Air Marshal as part of the leadership element, together with the Commander of the Indonesian National Armed Forces. As per President's decree Number 66 2019, a Wakil Panglima TNI is the coordinator of armed forces power consolidation to achieve inter-service operability. In performing his/her duty, Wakil Panglima reports to Panglima TNI.

Duty 
Duties of a Deputy Commander of the Indonesian National Armed Forces are:

 assist Commander of the National Armed Forces' daily operational duties
 provide advisory to Commander of the National Armed Forces regarding the national defense policy implementation, armed forces structure development, armed forces doctrine development, military strategy and armed forces power consolidation as well as the armed forces exercise of power
 perform Commander of the National Armed Forces' duties in his/her lieu
 perform other duties demanded by Commander of the National Armed Forces

References 

Leadership of Indonesian National Armed Forces
Military ranks of Indonesia